Rhabdochaeta crockeri is a species of tephritid or fruit flies in the genus Rhabdochaeta of the family Tephritidae.

Distribution
Indonesia, Papua New Guinea, New Britain, Australia, Solomon Island.

References

Tephritinae
Insects described in 1936
Diptera of Asia
Diptera of Australasia